Westlake Boulevard may refer to:

Former name of Westlake Avenue in Seattle, Washington, United States
A section of California State Route 23 in Southern California, United States